The 1878–79 season was the sixth season of competitive football in Scotland.  This season saw the introduction of the third regional competition with the inaugural playing of the Renfrewshire Cup.

Scottish Cup

County honours

 – replay
 – second replay

Other honours

Scotland national team

References

External links
Scottish Football Historical Archive

 
Seasons in Scottish football